The 39th Garhwal Rifles was an infantry regiment of the British Indian Army.

History

The regiment was first raised in 1887 as the Aligarh Levy but was disbanded after disgracing itself at the Rawalpindi Review in 1888. In 1891, the 39th (The Garhwali) Regiment of Bengal Infantry was formed from the 2nd Battalion, 3rd Gurkha Rifles. In 1892, they were given the title of "Rifles". A second battalion was raised in 1901, making the regiment the only two battalion regiment in the Indian Army, except for the Gurkhas.

During World War I both battalions were assigned to the Garhwal Brigade, which formed part of the 7th (Meerut) Division. Initially they were sent to Europe and in the early part of the war, suffered heavy casualties on the Western Front. The regiment was then sent to the Middle East take part in the Mesopotamia Campaign. Two more battalions were raised during the war. The regiment was next in action during the Waziristan campaign 1919–1920.

In 1921, the regiment was renamed as the "39th Royal Garhwal Rifles". During this time, the Indian government reorganized the structure of its infantry regiments, moving from single battalion regiments to multi-battalion regiments. In 1922, the 39th RGR was the only non-Gurkha Indian infantry regiment to remain intact and not be amalgamated. They were subsequently renumbered the 18th Royal Garhwal Rifles, consisting of three active battalions.

Victoria Cross recipients

The Victoria Cross (VC) is the highest and most prestigious award for gallantry in the face of the enemy that can be awarded to British and Commonwealth forces.  Indian troops only became eligible for the award in 1911. Three members of the regiment won the award:

 Darwan Singh Negi was among the earliest Indian recipients of the Victoria Cross. A Naik in the 1st Battalion, 39th Garhwal Rifles during World War I when the following deed took place for which he was awarded the VC, the citation was published in a supplement to the London Gazette of 4 December 1914 (dated 7 December 1914) and read:

His award was gazetted on the same date as that of Sepoy Khudadad Khan, But Negi considered the first Indian VC winner.

 Gabar Singh Negi was a Rifleman in the 2nd Battalion, 39th Garhwal Rifles, during World War I and was awarded the Victoria Cross for his actions on 10 March 1915 at the Battle of Neuve Chapelle, France.

 William David Kenny was a lieutenant in the 4th Battalion, 39th Garhwal Rifles during the Waziristan Campaign when the following deed took place for which he was awarded the VC.  The citation was published in a supplement to the London Gazette of 7 September 1920 (dated 9 September 1920):

Predecessor names
 2nd Battalion, 3rd (Kamaon) Gurkha Regiment – 1887
 39th (Garhwali) Bengal Infantry – 1890
 39th (Garhwal Rifles) Bengal Infantry – 1892
 39th Garhwal Rifles – 1903

See also
 49th Garhwal Rifles

References

Sources

External links
 

British Indian Army infantry regiments
Military units and formations established in 1887
Military units and formations disestablished in 1922
Bengal Presidency